Jan-Willem van Ewijk (born 28 July 1970, Delft) is a Dutch film director, actor and screenwriter.

Biography 
van Ewijk was born in Delft and spent his youth in the Netherlands and California. He moved back to Delft in 1989, where he studied aviation and aerospace engineering at Delft University of Technology where he graduated as an aircraft engineer. After his studies, he worked at Airbus, Beechcraft, Bombardier Aerospace and Monitor Deloitte
and was involved in the start-up of an investment bank. In 2002, he quit his job to dedicate himself to a film career. He started writing the script of  Nu. and founded the production house Propellor Film. The film was premiered at the 2006 Netherlands Film Festival, where he received an honorable mention. In 2014, his second feature film, Atlantic., premiered at the Toronto International Film Festival.

Filmography 
 Nu. (2006, director, scenario and actor)
 Atlantic. (2014, director, scenario and actor)

References

External links 
 

1970 births
Living people
People from Delft
Dutch male actors
Dutch film directors
Dutch screenwriters
Dutch male screenwriters